Jankapur High School is a Bengali Medium higher secondary school under the West Bengal Council of Secondary Education (WBCSE).

It is located at Paschim Medinipur, West Bengal, India.

See also
Education in India
List of schools in India
Education in West Bengal

References

External links

High schools and secondary schools in West Bengal
Schools in Paschim Medinipur district
Educational institutions established in 1940
1940 establishments in India